This is a survey of the postage stamps and postal history of Åland.

Åland forms an archipelago in the Baltic Sea that is an autonomous, Swedish-language-speaking region of Finland.

First stamps 
The first stamps of Åland were issued on 1 March 1984.

See also
Postage stamps and postal history of Finland

References

Further reading 
 Fillips, Robert. Aland Spezial 2004. Kornwestheim: R. Fillips, 2004  172p.
 Helkio, Eero J. Ahvenanmaa - Postitoimipaikat ja leimat = Åland - Postanstalter och stamplar = Åland - Post offices and their cancellations, 1812-1982. Laiti: Oy Kaj Hellman Ltd, 1982  96p.
 Mattsén, Björn and Kaarlo Hirvikoski. Alandia: Ålands poststämplar med posthistoria = Ahvenanmaan postileimat ja postihistoriaa = Åland postal cancellations and postal history = Poststempel mit Postgeschichte Ålands. Helsinki: Suomen filatelistiliitto, 1991  152p.
 Posten Åland. Åland 1984-2012: frimärkskatalog = postimerkkiluettelo = stamp catalogue = Briefmarkenkatalog. Mariehamn: Posten Åland, 2012 80p.
 Sarpaneva, Tom. Om varianter i Ålands frimärken: på svenska, suomeksi, auf Deutsch and in English. Helsinki: Tom Sarpaneva, 2003 74p.

External links 
 Official Åland stamp catalogue.
 Posten Åland (The Åland Post Office)

Communications in Åland
Philately of Finland
Aland